Karan Singh Thakral is the Executive Director of the Thakral Group of companies, a family business. The group is 117 years old with businesses in real estate, technology, consumer product distribution, manufacturing, and retail. The group is headquartered in Singapore and has offices running across 30 countries.

Business career
Karan serves as Chairman and Director of several companies in Thakral Group. His primary focus is on India, Singapore and Indonesia.

He is Singapore's Non-Resident Ambassador to Denmark. Previously, he served as Singapore's Non-Resident Ambassador to Sri Lanka. He has held positions for both private and government sectors in Singapore. He has served on the board of various Singapore Government related organizations.

Early and personal life  
Karan is married and has five children and seven grandchildren.

References

Singaporean people of Indian descent
Singaporean businesspeople
Living people
Singaporean people of Punjabi descent
1955 births